Cabazitaxel, sold under the brand name Jevtana, is a semi-synthetic derivative of a natural taxoid. It is a microtubule inhibitor, and the fourth taxane to be approved as a cancer therapy.

Cabazitaxel was developed by Sanofi-Aventis and was approved by the U.S. Food and Drug Administration (FDA) for the treatment of hormone-refractory prostate cancer in June 2010. It is available as a generic medication.

Medical uses 
Cabazitaxel is indicated in combination with prednisone for the treatment of metastatic castration-resistant prostate cancer following docetaxel-based treatment.

Mechanism of action 
Taxanes enhance microtubule stabilization and inhibit cellular mitosis and division. Moreover, taxanes prevent androgen receptor (AR) signaling by binding cellular microtubules and the microtubule-associated motor protein dynein, thus averting AR nuclear translocation.

Clinical trials
In patients with metastatic castration-resistant prostate cancer (mCRPC), overall survival (OS) is markedly enhanced with cabazitaxel versus mitoxantrone after prior docetaxel treatment. FIRSTANA (ClinicalTrials.gov identifier: NCT01308567) assessed whether cabazitaxel 20 mg/m2 (C20) or 25 mg/m2 (C25) is superior to docetaxel 75 mg/m2 (D75) in terms of OS in patients with chemotherapy-naïve mCRPC. However, C20 and C25 did not demonstrate superiority for OS versus D75 in patients with chemotherapy-naïve mCRPC. Cabazitaxel and docetaxel demonstrated different toxicity profiles, and C20 showed the overall lowest toxicity.
In a phase III trial with 755 men for the treatment of castration-resistant prostate cancer, median survival was 15.1 months for patients receiving cabazitaxel versus 12.7 months for patients receiving mitoxantrone. Cabazitaxel was associated with more grade 3–4 neutropenia (81.7%) than mitoxantrone (58%). Common adverse effects with cabazitaxel include neutropenia (including febrile neutropenia) and GIT side effects appeared mainly in diarrhea, whereas, neuropathy was rarely detected.

Pharmacokinetics 
Cabazitaxel administration causes a decrease in plasma concentrations showing triphasic kinetics: a mean half life (t1/2) of 2.6 min in the first phase, a mean t1/2 of 1.3 h in the second phase, and a mean t1/2 of 77.3 h in the third phase.

Metabolism 
Cabazitaxel is basically metabolized in the liver by [cytochrome P450 (CYP)3A4/5 > CYP2C8], which result in seven plasma metabolites and excreted 20 metabolites. During 14 days after administration, 80% of cabazitaxel is excreted: 76% in the feces and 3.7% as a renal excretion.

References

External links 
 
 
 
 
 

Microtubule inhibitors
Mitotic inhibitors
Carbamates
Benzoate esters
Acetate esters
Taxanes